Chicago Franchise Systems, Inc. operates Italian-based Chicago-style restaurants in Illinois, Georgia, North Carolina, and Missouri which specialize in Chicago-style cuisine. They have operated since 1990, when they took over the popular Nancy's Pizza chain of pizzerias. Nancy's itself was started in 1971 by Nancy and Rocco Palese, a couple who invented the concept of stuffed pizza. CFS, Inc. operates as a franchisor for Nancy's Pizzerias and Doughocracy Pizza and Brews. CFS, Inc. launched Doughocracy Pizza + Brews in 2015, a fast casual pizza place that gives customers the "Freedom to Choose" their own toppings on a hand stretched pizza crust that can be paired with local craft beers. There is one Doughocracy restaurant, in Geneva, Illinois.

Nancy's Pizza
Nancy's Pizza is credited with inventing Chicago-style stuffed pizza in 1971. Nancy and Rocco Palese, both hailing from Potenza, Basilicata, had lived most of their adult lives in Turin, before immigrating with their three children to the United States in 1969. After 18 months in Chicago, Nancy and Rocco opened their first pizza parlor, Guy's Pizza, featuring a popular thin crust pizza. In 1971 friends tried to get the Paleses to experiment with pan pizza. Rather than imitate others, Rocco decided to invent his own pizza, modeled after his family’s recipe for "scarciedda," an Easter specialty cake from his native region, Basilicata, and called his new invention Stuffed Pizza.

In 1974, Rocco and Nancy opened the first Nancy's location in Harwood Heights, Illinois, which could seat only 35 people. Three years later, they opened the first location in Chicago. In 1990, the Palese family sold the name Nancy’s Pizza and all development rights to Dave Howey, the president of Chicago Franchise Systems, Inc., who had been a licensee of the Paleses since 1977. Today, there are 20 Nancy's locations in Illinois, as well as six locations in the Atlanta, Georgia, area, one location in O'Fallon, Missouri, and one location in Raleigh, North Carolina.

Al's Beef

In 1938 Al Ferreri and his sister and brother-in-law, Frances and Chris Pacelli, Sr. developed the original Italian Beef sandwich, served at Al's Beef locations.

The original idea for the Italian beef sandwich was formed out of necessity.  In the great depression era, meat was scarce. Chris and Al would go to family weddings and in order to make the meat go around, the family sliced it thinly and made sandwiches. The first official Al's Beef stand began as a small, curbside, outdoor, wooden neighborhood food stand with countertop service located on Laflin and Harrison Streets, in Chicago’s “Little Italy” neighborhood.  The beef stand gradually grew and moved to its present location at 1079 W. Taylor Street, still in Chicago’s "Little Italy." It was here that they added Chicago hot dogs, fresh, homemade, hand-cut French fries, and Polish sausage to the menu. In 1999, Chicago Franchise Systems bought the rights to Al's #1 Italian Beef Restaurants. The first Al's franchised location opened in 2001 in Tinley Park, Illinois.  Al's retail locations are positioned to compete with local independent beef stands as well as larger corporate entities such as Portillo's and Buona Beef. 

On season 1 of Man v. Food, Adam Richman visited Al's Beef in Chicago and learned the official "Italian stance" for eating such a juicy sandwich.

Then in 2012, Richman returned to Al's on another show, Best Sandwich in America, where the Italian beef sandwich was chosen as best sandwich in the Midwest.

References

External links
Nancy's Pizza Website
Al's Beef Website
Doughocracy Pizza and Brews Website

Restaurants established in 1971
Regional restaurant chains in the United States
Pizza chains of the United States
Italian restaurants in the United States